Kambel Balad (also Romanized as Kambel Bālād) is a village in Kambel-e Soleyman Rural District, in the Central District of Chabahar County, Sistan and Baluchestan Province, Iran. At the 2006 census, its population was 363, in 68 families.

References 

Populated places in Chabahar County